Agramma is a genus of insects belonging to the family Tingidae.

The genus was described in 1829 by James Francis Stephens.

The genus has cosmopolitan distribution.

Species:
 Agramma ecmeles Drake & Ruhoff, 1962
 Agramma femorale
 Agramma laeta (Faller)
 Agramma pictipenne (Horváth, 1902)
 Agramma tropidopterum
 Agramma vulturnum

References

Tingidae